Livingstone Cottage and Monken Cottage are grade II listed buildings on Hadley Green Road facing Hadley Green. A plaque to the front reads, "David Livingstone lived here in the year 1857".

References

External links

Grade II listed buildings in the London Borough of Barnet
Houses in the London Borough of Barnet
Monken Hadley